Phulmaddi is a village in Vikarabad district, in Telangana State.

Transport 
The village is situated to the west of the Vikarabad-Sadasivapet State Highway with connections to nearby towns and cities with regular buses and other modes of transportation. Vikarabad Railway station (10 kilometers away) has a lot of express and passenger trains passing through, with lines toward Secunderabad, Wadi, Mumbai and Nanded.

References 

Villages in Vikarabad district